Wortley is a civil parish in the metropolitan borough of Barnsley, South Yorkshire, England.  The parish contains 25 listed buildings that are recorded in the National Heritage List for England.  Of these, one is listed at Grade II*, the middle of the three grades, and the others are at Grade II, the lowest grade.  The parish contains the village of Wortley and the surrounding countryside.  In the parish is the country house, Wortley Hall, which is listed, together with associated structures and items in the gardens and grounds.  The other listed buildings include houses and cottages, two cross bases, a church, a public house, a milestone, and three mileposts.


Key

Buildings

References

Citations

Sources

 

Lists of listed buildings in South Yorkshire
Buildings and structures in the Metropolitan Borough of Barnsley